Chenaran-e Jadid (also Romanized as Chenārān-e Jadīd; also known as Chenārān, Kalāt-e Chenārān, and Kalāteh-i-Chinārān) is a village in Shaskuh Rural District, Central District, Zirkuh County, South Khorasan Province, Iran. At the 2006 census, its population was 140, in 32 families.

References 

Populated places in Zirkuh County